Hadley P. Arkes (born 1940) is an American political scientist and the Edward N. Ney Professor of Jurisprudence and American Institutions emeritus at Amherst College, where he has taught since 1966. He is currently the founder and director of the James Wilson Institute on Natural Rights & the American Founding in Washington, D.C.

Education 
Arkes received a B.A. degree at the University of Illinois and a Ph.D. from the University of Chicago where he was a student of Leo Strauss.

Career 
In a series of books and articles dating from the mid-1980s, Arkes has written on a priori moral principles and advocated for their impact on constitutional interpretation. He has also dealt with their relation to constitutional jurisprudence and natural law, and their  challenge to moral relativism. His works draw on political philosophers from Aristotle through the U.S. Founding Fathers, Lincoln, and contemporary authors and jurists.

John O. McGinnis, reviewing Arkes' Constitutional Illusions & Anchoring Truths in The Wall Street Journal, writes that it tries to find a path between the extremes of originalism, where the meaning of the U. S.Constitution is fixed by its original text, and the idea of the living constitution, where its meaning is updated by evolving moral principles.

Arkes is founder and a member of the Committee for the American Founding, a group of Amherst alumni and students seeking to preserve the doctrines of "natural rights" exposited by some American Founders and Lincoln through the Colloquium on the American Founding at Amherst and in Washington, D.C.

Arkes serves on the advisory board and writes for First Things, an ecumenical journal that focuses on encouraging a "religiously informed public philosophy for the ordering of society." Arkes also serves on the advisory boards of Americans United for Life, the Catholic League, and St. Augustine's Press. Arkes serves on the board of trustees of the National Center on Sexual Exploitation.

In September 2016, Arkes was among 125 Conservatives for Trump who announced they supported Donald Trump's candidacy to be president.

Personal life 
In 2010, Arkes, born and raised a Jew, converted to Catholicism, which he described as a fulfillment of his Jewish faith.

Selected publications
 Bureaucracy, regime and presumption : the national interests on the Marshall Plan (dissertation: University of Chicago, 1967).
  The Philosopher in the City (Princeton University Press, 1981).
 First Things: An Inquiry into the First Principles of Morals and Justice (Princeton University Press, 1986).
 On natural rights : speaking prose all our lives (Heritage Foundation, 1992).
 A jurisprudence of natural rights : how an earlier generation of judges did it (Heritage Foundation, 1992).
 Beyond the Constitution (Princeton University Press, 1992).
 The Return of George Sutherland: Restoring a Jurisprudence of Natural Rights (Princeton University Press, 1997).
 The mission of the military and the question of "the regime" (Colorado Springs, CO: United States Air Force Academy, 1997).
 Natural Rights and the Right to Choose (Cambridge University Press, 2002).
 Constitutional Illusions and Anchoring Truths : The Touchstone of the Natural Law (Cambridge University Press, 2010).

See also
 List of Amherst College people

References

External links
 Faculty page at Amherst College
 Staff page at James Wilson Institute on Natural Rights and the American Founding
 Fellow Page at Ethics and Public Policy Center
 Page of Articles at the Claremont Institute
 

Living people
University of Illinois Urbana-Champaign alumni
University of Chicago alumni
American political scientists
Amherst College faculty
1940 births
Converts to Roman Catholicism from Judaism